Distinction, distinct or distinctive may refer to:

 Distinction (philosophy), the recognition of difference
 Formal distinction
 Distinction (law), a principle in international law governing the legal use of force in an armed conflict
 Distinction (sociology), a social force that places different values on different individuals
 Distinct (mathematics)
 Distinctive feature, a concept in linguistics
 Distinción, in Spanish, separating consonantal sounds, see Phonological history of Spanish coronal fricatives
 The Hua–Yi distinction, the difference between China (Hua) and barbarian outsiders (Yi), applied culturally and ethnically
 Distinction (book), a book by Pierre Bourdieu
 Distinction (horse), Irish gelding, third in the 2005 Melbourne Cup
 Distinction (song), song and album by The Suffrajets

Awards and honors
 an Award or quality of an award recipient
 Latin honors, indications of relative achievement among academic degree recipients
 Any one of the Nine Distinctions, awarded by the Chinese emperor
 Order of Distinction, award in the Jamaican school honours system
 in Austrian Bundesheer, German Bundeswehr and Norwegian Army synonym for rank insignia

See also
 Distinguishable (disambiguation)